The Port of Santo Domingo is located at the mouth of the marine entrance to the city of Santo Domingo, Dominican Republic. The port is suited for both turnaround and transit visits. It is located 16 kilometres from the port of Rio Haina.

Overview

The Port of Santo Domingo is being totally renovated as part of a major redevelopment project aimed at  integrating the port area and Santo Domingo's
Colonial City to create an attractive destination for cruise, yacht and high-end tourism.

The project, supported by legislation approved in 2005, is being developed by a private consortium and includes the construction of new infrastructure:
the rehabilitation of the two current terminals, major dredging works in the approach channel and turning basin, a new sports marina and a  real estate development.

The port's rehabilitation started in early 2006, and includes the Don Diego Terminal refurbishment (completed in December 2006) and the building of a new Sans Souci Terminal (completion in early May 2008).

Port information

 Location:  
 Local time: UTC−4
 Weather/climate/prevailing winds:  From May 15 until September 15.
 Climate: mostly sunny, tropical. Hurricane season runs from June to November
 Prevailing winds: direction ENE–ESE.
 Average temperature range: 28–30 °C.

Don Diego Terminal 

The Don Diego Terminal boast a contemporary, functional design, styled to take advantage of natural light and the terminal's easy access to the Colonial City.

The terminal has two cruise reception areas, the North and South wings.

Its most distinctive feature is the large marine stained-glass facade. The terminal also has an entrance hall with a stand for information, access to an international and local telecommunications center (phone and internet), currency exchange and restrooms.

The South Wing, which can double as a transit and a homeport terminal  has an ample  hall, which includes modular duty-free stores, check-in facilities and pier access.

The terminal has parking facilities for visitors and a specially designated parking spaces for tourism company buses.

An integral lighting system that includes all the outside and perimeter area of Don Diego Terminal, for greater security and nocturnal visibility to visitors; the pier's perimeter is completely surrounded by an interlocked fence and has a safe circulation area with restricted access. The terminal also has a security surveillance CCTV systems as well as specialized port security personnel.

Don Diego Terminal has ISPS Certification.

The Don Diego Pier specifications are:

Length of pier: 400 meters / 1296 feet
Height of pier AWL: 2.16 meters / 7 feet
Apron width: 10 meters / 32 feet
Distance between bollards: 12  meters / 38 feet
Strength of bollards: 100 tons pull
Depth of water at low tide: 9.7 meters / 31.4 feet
Turning basin max length: 370 meters / 1200 feet
Max LOA allowed: 360 meters / 1166 feet
Availability of gangway: No
Distance from pier to city: 0.1 miles

Sans Souci Terminal

The Sans Souci terminal, is a state-of-the-art homeport terminal, combining the essential in design, flexibility in the spaces and illumination; respectful architectonic relation with the Colonial City. The terminal is able to handle nearly 3,800 passengers plus crew and able to accommodate today's largest ships (eagle-class or equivalent).

The terminal has the following facilities: a ground level for baggage handling and disembarking; a  mezzanine level which accommodates immigration, duty-free stores, internet center, information stand, bathrooms and other facilities as planned; allowing passengers a view to Sans Souci's ground level, as well, a view to the river, sea, and Colonial City. The second floor is an open  area which is an ample footbridge that crosses all the structure, and houses the gangway for ship access (embarkation/disembarkation).

The terminal also offers other facilities, such as:  ample areas for loading and unloading of baggage and containers, accessible parking lots for visitors and tour operator's vehicles, a complete security system: CCTV, x-ray detectors and fire detection.

The Sans Souci Pier specifications are:
Length of pier: 250 meters / 810 feet
Height of pier AWL: 2.16 meters / 7 feet
Apron width: 30 meters / 97.2 feet
Fenders: foam-filled hanging fenders -  diameter
Distance between bollards: 5  meters / 16 feet
Strength of bollards: 100 tons / 2 - 150 tons
Depth of water at low tide: 9.7 meters / 31.4 feet
Turning basin max length: 370 meters / 1200 feet
Max LOA allowed: 360 meters / 1166 feet
Availability of gangway: yes, team pax gangway to 3rd floor of terminal
Distance from pier to city: 1 mile

See also 

 List of ports and harbours of the Atlantic Ocean

References 
 
 
 
 

Notes

Ports and harbours of the Dominican Republic
Urban planning in the Dominican Republic
Buildings and structures in Santo Domingo